Oh, What a Night! is a 1926 American silent comedy film directed by Lloyd Ingraham and starring Raymond McKee,Edna Murphy and Charles K. French.

Cast
 Raymond McKee as 	Robert 'Bob' Brady
 Edna Murphy as 	June Craig
 Charles K. French as John Craig
 Wilfrid North as Dean Simpson 
 Ned Sparks as 'Slickry' Benton
 Frank Alexander as 	Bill Williams
 Hilliard Karr as Detective
 Jackie Combs as 	Baby Tommy

References

Bibliography
 Connelly, Robert B. The Silents: Silent Feature Films, 1910-36, Volume 40, Issue 2. December Press, 1998.
 Munden, Kenneth White. The American Film Institute Catalog of Motion Pictures Produced in the United States, Part 1. University of California Press, 1997.

External links
 

1926 films
1926 comedy films
1920s English-language films
American silent feature films
Silent American comedy films
American black-and-white films
Films directed by Lloyd Ingraham
1920s American films